The Armoured Battalion is the first battalion and an infantry unit of the Norwegian Army. Although it is categorised as an armoured unit, the battalion (strictly a battlegroup) primarily serves in the mechanised infantry role. As with the Telemark Bataljon it also has a tank squadron equipped with the Leopard 2 main battle tank. It was formed in 1987 and has participated in several international operations in the Balkans (KFOR) and in Afghanistan (ISAF). The battalion is recognised as a cavalry unit for ceremonial purposes, so its enlisted soldiers are referred to as dragoons as opposed to privates, as is the case in most of the Norwegian Army.

Organization

Stridsvogneskadronen – The second squadron, known as ESK2, Strv esk 2 or Stridsvogneskadronen (The Armoured Squadron) is the battalion's main strike weapon. The squadron operates with the Leopard 2 main battle tank. The unit colour is red.
Stormeskadron 3 – The third squadron, known as ESK3 or Stormeskadron 3 (Assault Squadron 3). The squadron's role is to support ESK2 with mechanised infantry support. The squadron is based on quick and aggressive assaults with infantry squads supported by their CV90 infantry fighting vehicles. The unit colour is yellow. The Motto of the squadron is "Semper Paratus", which means always ready.
Stormeskadron 4 – The fourth squadron, known as ESK4 or Stormeskadron 4 (Assault Squadron 4). The squadron has the same role as that of ESK3. The unit colour is green, and their motto " Gulo ad arma, Plus Ultra" meaning "Wolverines to battle, continue forward" is in reference to their ability to push forward in combat.
Kavalerieskadronen – The fifth squadron, known as ESK5, KavEsk or Kavalerieskadronen (The Cavalry Squadron) is a reconnaissance unit. Its roles also include artillery observation and sharpshooters. It also uses the CV90 infantry fighting vehicle. The unit colour is blue. The Armoured Reconnaissance platoon in ESK1 has the motto "Primus Intrat, Exit Novissimus" meaning "First in, last out".
Kampstøtteeskadronen – The sixth squadron, known as ESK6 or Kampstøtte Eskadron 6 (Combat Support Squadron 6). The largest and most complex of the battalion's units, its capabilities include logistics support, repair and recovery, signals, medevac and mortar support. The unit is also responsible for the protection and operation of the battalion's base of operations. The unit colour is black. The squadron motto is "Volens et Potens" which means willing and able.
Minkebataljonen – During operations the battalion is usually supported by elements of the Combat Service support battalion, Engineer battalion, Intelligence battalion, Artillery battalion and Medical Battalion as well as Military police and other elements that may be attached depending on the mission. This combat group is known as Minkebataljonen.

The motto of the battalion is Bitit fyrst (Old Norse for "Strike First"), referring to the offensive role of the battalion.

External links
Norwegian Army page on Panserbattaljonen (in Norwegian)

Battalions of Norway
Military units and formations established in 1987
1987 establishments in Norway